(Thirty-Three and a Third) is a series of books, each about a single music album. The series title refers to the rotation speed of a vinyl LP,  RPM.

History 
Originally published by Continuum, the series was founded by editor David Barker in 2003. At the time, Continuum published a series of short books on literature called Continuum Contemporaries. One-time series editor Ally-Jane Grossan mentioned that Barker was "an obsessive music fan who thought, 'This is a really cool idea, why don't we apply this to albums'. PopMatters wrote that the range consists of "obscure classics to more usual suspects by the Beach Boys, the Beatles, and the Rolling Stones".

In 2010, Continuum was bought out by Bloomsbury Publishing, which continues to publish the series.  Following a leave, Barker was replaced by Grossan in January 2013. Leah Babb-Rosenfeld has been the editor of the series since 2016.

Several independent books have been spun off of the series. The first, Carl Wilson's 2007 entry on Celine Dion's Let's Talk About Love, was expanded for a 2014 Bloomsbury reissue with material not specifically pertaining to the Dion album and retitled Let's Talk About Love: Why Other People Have Such Bad Taste. Joe Bonomo, at the invitation of Barker, expanded his  proposal on Jerry Lee Lewis's Live at the Star Club, Hamburg album into a full-length book about Lewis, the album, and his career titled Jerry Lee Lewis: Lost and Found, published by Continuum in 2009. A rejected proposal from writer Brett Milano for an entry on Game Theory's 1987 album Lolita Nation was instead expanded by Milano into a biography on the band's leader Scott Miller; that project, titled Don't All Thank Me at Once: The Lost Genius of Scott Miller, was released by 125 Books in 2015.

In August 2017, Bloomsbury announced the launch of  Global, an extension of the  series to popular music from around the world. The first two sub-series launched were  Brazil, edited by Jason Stanyek, and  Japan, edited by Noriko Manabe. The first book for  Brazil was Caetano Veloso's A Foreign Sound by Barbara Browning. The first books for  Japan were Supercell ft. Hatsune Miku by Keisuke Yamada and Yoko Kanno's Cowboy Bebop Soundtrack by Rose Bridges.

Published titles 
, 161 books have been published in the main series.

Main series

33⅓ Japan

33⅓ Brazil

33⅓ Europe

Forthcoming titles

Unconfirmed Release Dates
 Band of Gypsys by Michael E. Veal on the album by Jimi Hendrix (1970)
Timeless by Martyn Deykers on the album by Goldie (1995)
 Tin Drum by Agata Pyzik on the album by Japan (1981)
Return to the 36 Chambers: The Dirty Version by Jarett Kobek on the album by Ol' Dirty Bastard (1995)
 Hamilton by Branden Jacobs-Jenkins on the original Broadway cast recording of Hamilton (2015)
I Want You by Derrais Carter on the album by Marvin Gaye (1976)
Time's Up by Kimberly Mack on the album by Living Colour (1990)
Come Away with ESG by Cheri Percy on the album by ESG (1983)
Nightbirds by Craig Seymour on the album by Labelle (1974)
BBC Radiophonic Workshop – A Retrospective by William Weir on the album by BBC Radiophonic Workshop (2008)
Body Count by Ben Apatoff on the album by Body Count (1992) 
Invasion of Privacy by Ma’Chell Duma on the album by Cardi B (2018)
101 by Mary Valle on the album by Depeche Mode (1989)
White Limozeen by Steacy Easton on the album by Dolly Parton (1989)
Ingénue by Joanna McNaney Stein on the album by k.d. lang (1992)
Here’s Little Richard by Jordan Bassett on the album by Little Richard (1957)
Erotica by Michael T. Dango on the album by Madonna (1992)
Madvillainy by Will Hagle on the album by Madvillain (2004)
Shout at the Devil by Micco Caporale on the album by Mötley Crüe (1983)
Sandinista! by Micajah Henley on the album by The Clash (1980)
Beauty and the Beat by Lisa Whittington-Hill on the album by The Go-Go's (1981)

33⅓ Brazil

33⅓ Europe

See also
 Boss Fight Books – a publisher that releases an eponymous series about notable video games

References

External links
 Official blog for the series
 TimesOnline on the book series.

Book series introduced in 2003
Series of books
Books about rock music
Bloomsbury Publishing books